Hunter Forest was an American college football coach. He was the head football coach at Michigan State Normal College—now known as Eastern Michigan University—in Ypsilanti, Michigan for one season, in 1903, compiling a record of 4–4.

Head coaching record

References

Year of birth missing
Year of death missing
Eastern Michigan Eagles football coaches